Grammodes arenosa is a moth of the family Noctuidae first described by Charles Swinhoe in 1902. It is found in Australia.

References

Ophiusina
Moths described in 1902